The following is a list of rosters for each nation competing in men's baseball at the 2019 Pan American Games.

Key

Group A

Manager  Pedro López

Manager  Julio Sánchez

Manager  Kenny Rodríguez

Manager  Juan González

Group B

Manager  Rolando Arnedo

Manager  Ernie Whitt

Manager  José Mosquera

Manager  Rey Vicente Anglada

References

Men's team rosters